Wellington Park is a rural locality in the local government areas of Derwent Valley, Hobart, Glenorchy, Huon Valley, and Kingborough in the South-east and Hobart regions of Tasmania. The 2016 census determined a population of nil for the state suburb of Wellington Park.

History
Wellington Park is a confirmed suburb/locality.

Geography
Almost all of the boundaries consist of survey lines. Mount Wellington, officially kunanyi / Mount Wellington, is within the locality.

Road infrastructure
The C616 route (Pinnacle Road) enters from the east and follows a winding route to the summit of Mount Wellington, where it ends.

References

Localities of Derwent Valley Council
Localities of City of Hobart
Localities of City of Glenorchy
Localities of Kingborough Council
Towns in Tasmania
Localities of Huon Valley Council